Millwood High School is a public secondary school in Middle Sackville, Nova Scotia that offers a post-secondary preparation program for students in grades nine through twelve. It is a part of the Halifax Regional School Board, and one of 17 high schools in the Halifax Regional Municipality.  The current principal is Stephen Corkum.

History 

Until 1986, Sackville High School was the only secondary school in the Sackville River valley.  Due to the increase in accessibility to employment and services in nearby Halifax, was facilitated by the construction of provincial Highways 101 and 102 through the town in the 1970s, Sackville experienced a rapid growth in population.  To accommodate this increase in population, Millwood High School was established in 1986, first in split shifts using the Sackville High building, and subsequently from early 1989 in its own building. Millwood High originally served the expanding communities of Lower, Middle, and Upper Sackville, Beaverbank, and Lucasville.  The school originally had two feeder schools: Sackville Heights Junior High and Harold T. Barrett Junior High, until 2000 when Harold T. Barrett Junior High students were diverted to the newly opened Lockview High School in nearby Fall River, Nova Scotia. As a result, Millwood High saw a substantial decrease in population, which ultimately had a negative impact on many academic offerings and previously flourishing extracurricular activities. Though Millwood has suffered from these changes, many student groups and teams, notably the Millwood Hockey and Curling teams, continue to enjoy success, having advanced to provincial competition on numerous occasions. The soccer team has enjoyed success in recent years, progressing to the Division II final three years in a row, winning in 2010/2011 and 2011/2012. In its final years as a 10-12 school, Millwood employed approximately forty teachers, supplemented by  two guidance counsellors, and its administration, and served a student population of about 665.

Commencing in September 2014 Millwood, along with Sackville High School, added Grade 9 to its student body, while nearby junior high schools became Grade 6-8 schools (middle schools).

Notable alumni 

 Patrick Pentland - lead guitarist and vocals of rock band Sloan native to Halifax, among other local bands and groups. Pentland graduated in 1987, Millwood High's inaugural year.

References

External links 
 School webpage
 School profile at Halifax Regional School Board

High schools in Halifax, Nova Scotia
Schools in Halifax, Nova Scotia